Oscar Ahlström (born ) is a Swedish professional ice hockey player (right wing), who is currently playing for HC Merano of the Italian second tier Italian Hockey League.

Ahlström has previously played in his youth team, Huddinge IK, of the HockeyAllsvenskan before making his Swedish Hockey League debut with AIK IF. He has a twin brother, Victor, who also plays in Merano.

Career statistics

References

External links 

Living people
1986 births
AIK IF players
Frisk Asker Ishockey players
Huddinge IK players
Södertälje SK players
IF Sundsvall Hockey players
Swedish ice hockey right wingers
Swedish twins
Twin sportspeople